Bekwai may refer to

Town
Bekwai a town in the Ashanti Region of Ghana
Sefwi Bekwai a town in the Western Region of Ghana

Constituency
Bekwai (Ghana parliament constituency)

District
Bekwai Municipal Assembly